Jose-Roberto Sierra Aguerro (born 21 March 1967 in Camargo) is a former Spanish cyclist. He participated in 5 Tours de France, 1 Giro d'Italia, and 4 Vuelta a España.

Major results
1996
1st Vuelta a La Rioja

References

1967 births
Living people
Spanish male cyclists
People from Camargo, Cantabria
Cyclists from Cantabria